Lee Hak-joo (born January 9, 1989) is a South Korean actor. He is best known for his roles in the television series The World of the Married (2020) and My Name (2021).

Personal life 
On September 13, 2022, Lee's agency announced that he is getting married to his non-celebrity girlfriend in November. They married on November 6, 2022.

Filmography

Films

Television series

Web series

Awards and nominations

References

External links
 
 
 

1989 births
Living people
Hanyang University alumni
South Korean male film actors
South Korean male television actors
21st-century South Korean male actors